Ourapteryx nigrociliaris is a moth of the family Geometridae first described by John Henry Leech in 1891. It is found in China and Taiwan.

Subspecies
Ourapteryx nigrociliaris nigrociliaris (China)
Ourapteryx nigrociliaris magnifica Inoue 1985 (Taiwan)

References

Moths described in 1891
Ourapterygini